Ilona Staller (born 26 November 1951), widely known by her stage name Cicciolina ("little chubby one"), is a Hungarian-Italian former porn star, politician, and singer.

Early life
Ilona was born in Budapest, Hungary. Her father, László Staller, left the family when she was young. She was raised by her mother, who was a midwife, and her stepfather, who was an official in the Hungarian Ministry of the Interior.

In 1964, she began working as a model for the Hungarian news agency, M.T.I. In her memoirs and in a 1999 TV interview, she claimed that she had provided the Hungarian authorities with information on American diplomats staying at a Budapest luxury hotel where she worked as a maid in the 1960s. By the age of 25, and during her hotel work, she met an older Italian national named Salvatore Martini whom she later married in 1968.

Pornography and show business
Naturalized by marriage and settled in Italy, Staller met pornographer Riccardo Schicchi in the early 1970s, and, beginning in 1973, achieved fame with a radio show called Voulez-vous coucher avec moi? on Radio Luna. For that program she adopted the name Cicciolina. Although she appeared in several films from 1970, she made her debut under her own name in 1975 with La liceale (also known as The Teasers) by playing with Gloria Guida as her lesbian classmate.

In 1978, on the RAI show C'era due Volte, her breasts were the first to be bared live on Italian TV. Staller appeared in her first hardcore pornographic film, Telefono rosso ("Red Telephone") in 1983. She produced the film together with Schicchi's company Diva Futura. Her memoirs were published as Confessioni erotiche di Cicciolina ("Erotic confessions of Cicciolina") by Olympia Press of Milan in 1987. The film was later to create a furor when it was revealed that Holmes had tested positive for HIV prior to appearing in it. Staller has appeared nude in Playboys editions in several countries. Her first Playboy appearance was in Argentina in March 1988. Other appearances for the magazine were in the U.S. (September 1990), Hungary (June 2005), Serbia (July 2005) and Mexico (September 2005).

In 1987, invited by a local magazine, she visited the Portuguese Parliament and posed topless before being stopped by the authorities, to general giggles, leading to the suspending of the session and originating official complaints from members of CDS. Only Natália Correia was seen talking to the Italian member of parliament.

In 1996, she appeared in the film Replikator and, in 1996, she had a role in the Brazilian soap opera  as Princess Ludovica di Castelgandolfo di Genova. In 2008, she was a contestant on the Argentine version of Strictly Come Dancing named Bailando por un Sueño.

Political life

In 1979, Staller was presented as a female candidate to the Italian parliament by the Lista del Sole, Italy's first Green party. In 1985, she switched to the Partito Radicale, campaigning on a libertarian platform against nuclear energy and NATO membership, as well as for human rights. She was elected to the Italian parliament in 1987, with approximately 20,000 votes. While in office, and before the outset of the Gulf War, she offered to have sex with Iraqi leader Saddam Hussein in return for peace in the region. She was not re-elected at the end of her term in 1991.

In 1991, Staller was among the founders of another Italian political movement, called Partito dell'Amore ("Party of Love"), which was spearheaded by friend and fellow porn star Moana Pozzi. In January 2002, she began exploring the possibility of campaigning in Hungary, her country of birth, to represent Budapest's industrial Kőbánya district in the Hungarian parliament. However, she failed to collect enough petition signatures for a non-partisan candidacy. In the same year, she ran in local elections in Monza, Italy, promising to convert a prominent building into a gambling casino, but she attracted few votes. In 2004, she announced plans to run for mayor of Milan with a similar promise. She renewed her offer to have sex with Saddam Hussein in October 2002, when Iraq was resisting international pressure to allow inspections for weapons of mass destruction, and in April 2006, she made the same offer to Osama bin Laden.

In September 2011, it was revealed that Staller was eligible for and would be receiving a yearly pension of 39,000 euros from the Italian state as a result of her five years in the country's parliament. Reacting to the controversy raised by the news, the former porn star, who started receiving the pension in November 2011, when she turned 60, stated: "I earned it and I'm proud of it."

In 2012, Staller founded the Democracy, Nature and Love Party (DNA). Its objectives included the legalization of same-sex marriage, the reopening of former brothels ("closed houses"), a guaranteed minimum wage for young people, improvements to the judiciary, and the elimination of the privileges of the rich political "caste".

She was also a candidate, on a proposal by blogger Luca Bagatin, in administrative elections in Rome on 26 and 27 May 2013, on the list 'Republicans and Liberals'.

Musical career
Staller has recorded several songs, mostly from live performances, with explicit lyrics being sung to a children's melody. Her most famous song is "", a song entirely dedicated to il cazzo, which means "the dick" in Italian. Because of its extensive use of profanity, the song could not be released in Italy, but became a hit in other countries, especially in France. The song gained considerable popularity in the internet era, when many Italian speakers were able to hear it for the first time.

Several unreleased songs were recorded during her RCA period and the Diva Futura agency period. Some of these unreleased songs were subsequently used during her TV shows, live performances or as soundtracks in her porn movies.

Personal life
She was the muse of American artist Jeff Koons, who persuaded her to collaborate on a series of sculptures and photographs of them having sex in many positions, settings and costumes, which were exhibited under the title Made in Heaven and made waves at the 1990 Venice Biennale. Staller married Koons in 1991. In 1992 they had a son, Ludwig, but separated the following year, partly because Staller refused to stop making porn. Their marriage ended in 1994. In violation of a US court order, (Koons had custody of Ludwig) Staller left the US for Italy, taking their then-two-year-old son, Ludwig. In 2008, Staller filed suit against Koons for failing to pay child support.

Staller is an accomplished chess player, having learned from her father while growing up in Hungary. In July 2021 it was announced she would demonstrate her ability in an exhibition match, taking on four top players simultaneously.

In popular culture
In 1980, an erotic comics series, La Cicciolina, was made by Giovanni Romanini and Lucio Filippucci, based on the actress.

Italian metal band Bulldozer released the track "Ilona the Very Best" on their 1987 album IX in dedication to her. Later in 2005, Japanese metal band Abigail released the compilation "Abigail Loves Ilona, as She Is the Very Best" featuring a photograph of Ilona as the album art, and includes several Bulldozer covers.

British band Pop Will Eat Itself released a song called "Touched by the Hand of Cicciolina" as an unofficial World Cup single in July 1990. The song reached number 28 on the UK Singles Chart.

American industrial 1990s band, Machines of Loving Grace, paid tribute to Cicciolina on their first, self-titled album and named a song after her as part of a campaign to get her to present the FIFA World Cup trophy at the 1990 tournament.

Brazilian musician Fausto Fawcett also wrote a song in tribute to Cicciolina, titled "Cicciolina (O Cio Eterno)", featured on his 1989 album Império dos Sentidos.

Chilean punk band Los Peores de Chile released a song titled "Chicholina" in 1994, which had heavy TV and radio airplay, receiving critical acclaim by the national music press at the time.

Finnish singer Erika Vikman released a song titled "Cicciolina" on 26 January 2020. It was selected as one of six entries that competed to represent Finland in the Eurovision Song Contest 2020. The song finished in second place in the national selection.

In the 2020 Spanish television series Veneno, Cicciolina, played by Miriam Giovanelli, was portrayed attending to a party in Gran Canaria in 1996, where she met Spanish personality La Veneno.

Discography

LPs/CDs
 1979 Ilona Staller (RCA PL 31442) published at least in Italy and Colombia. (The Colombian record has titles in Spanish.) A music tape also exists.
 Track list: I Was Made for Dancin' / Pane Marmellata e Me / Labbra / Benihana / Lascia l'ultimo ballo per me / Cavallina Cavallo (by Ennio Morricone) / It's all up to you / Professor of Percussions / Più su sempre più su
 1987 Muscolo Rosso (Boy Records) published in Spain only.
 Track list: Russians / Inno (Come un angelo) / Satisfaction / Telefono rosso (Avec toi) / Black Sado / Goccioline (Bambole) / Perversion / Animal Rock / Nirvana / Muscolo rosso / Muscolo rosso (reprise)
 1988 Sonhos Eróticos printed in Brazil only. (All Disc 00.101.009, also music tape 00.107.009.) Reprint of the English long playing Erotic dreams plus two Cicciolina songs "Muscolo rosso" and "Avec toi". The other songs are performed by Erotic Dreams Band. Some of Cicciolina's speeches are used in "La prima volta" song. Cover is dedicated to Cicciolina.
 Track list: Muscolo rosso / Emmanuelle / Bilitis / Le réve / La prima volta / I feel love / Je t'aime... moi non plus / Histoire d'O / Les Femmes / Black Emmanuelle / Love to love you bay / Avec toi
 1994 Sonhos Eróticos (Brazil only, All Disc RQ 032) Reprint of 1988 LP with a new layout of the cover, with background from brown to pink and violet.
 2000 Ilona Staller (CD, in United Kingdom only, Sequel Records/Caste Music NEMCD398); reprint on CD of the 1979 LP, plus the two extended tracks of the red vinyl mix.
 2000 Ilona Staller (LP, in United Kingdom only, Sequel Record/Castle Music NEMLP398); white label promotional test pressings, less than 5, were made for a proposed but ultimately cancelled vinyl release of the CD reissue.

7" disks
 1976 "Voulez vous coucher avec moi?" (Italy only, with neither serial number nor cover; on the vinyl it is written "Nuovo Playore 1° Radio Rete 4 D.R." only); from the same-named radio programme on Radio Luna station by Riccardo Schicchi where the nickname Cicciolina was born.
 1979 "I Was Made for Dancin'" / "Più su sempre su su" (Italy only, RCA PB 6323)
 1979 "Cavallina Cavallo" / "Più su sempre più su" (Japan only, RCA SS 3205)
 1980 "Buone Vacanze" / "Ti amo uomo" (Italy only, RCA BB 6449)
 1981 "Ska Skatenati" / "Disco Smack" (Italy only, LUPUS LUN 4917)
 1987 "Muscolo rosso" / "Avec toi" (SFC 17117–7) symbol of the Italian Radical Party on the cover. The record was published in France and limited in other European countries.
 1987 "Muscolo rosso" / "Russians" (Spain only, BOY-028-PRO) promo for journalist; no cover.

12" mix and picture disks
 1979 "I Was Made for Dancin'" (extended version) / "Save the Last Dance for Me" (English original version of "Lascia l'ultimo ballo per me") (Italy only, RCA PD 6327, red vinyl mix without cover, promo for DJs).
 1987 "Muscolo Rosso" / "Russians" (Spain only, BOY-028) versions are not extended, the same as 7".
 1989 "San Francisco Dance" / "Living in my Paradise" / "My Sexy Shop" (Acv 5472) Picture disk; limited edition; published in Europe, together with her colleague Moana Pozzi's release.

Collaborations
 1979 Dedicato al Mar Egeo, LP soundtrack by Ennio Morricone published in Japan only; though she does not sing, she is portrayed naked on the inlay and back-cover. She recorded two songs from that album ("Cavallina a cavallo" and "Mar Egeo") later in the year. The LP exists in two versions, one with Japanese titles, the other with Italian titles. Also, a CD version exists.
 1979 Aquarium sounds, LP of an Italian TV programme; she sings on the track "Elena Tip".

References

Bibliography
  Graphic novel about her life (in French)
  Large-format Italian, German, English and French language album
  Features a chapter on Cicciolina (in Danish)

External links

  
 
 

1951 births
Living people
Actresses from Budapest
Hungarian emigrants to Italy
Italian people of Hungarian descent
Italian television personalities
Italian pornographic film actresses
Hungarian pornographic film actresses
Italian actor-politicians
Radical Party (Italy) politicians
Deputies of Legislature X of Italy
20th-century Italian women politicians
Obscenity controversies in television
Television controversies in Italy
Bailando por un Sueño (Argentine TV series) participants
Women members of the Chamber of Deputies (Italy)